Holoptygma braulio is a species of moth of the family Tortricidae. It is found in Costa Rica.

The wingspan is about 23 mm. The ground colour of the forewings is dark yellow, basally tinged orange towards the middle and mixed with rust terminally. The hindwings are brownish, slightly  tinged orange.

Etymology
The species name refers to the type locality.

References

Moths described in 2011
Atteriini
Moths of Central America
Taxa named by Józef Razowski